Noel Tyrrell (12 September 1932 – 4 May 2010) was an  Australian rules footballer who played with South Melbourne in the Victorian Football League (VFL).

Notes

External links 

1932 births
2010 deaths
Australian rules footballers from Victoria (Australia)
Sydney Swans players
Oakleigh Football Club players